The Welsh Presbyterian Church in Plana, South Dakota is a historic church about  north of SD 12 and  east of SD 16.  The church was built in 1887 by Welsh immigrants. It was added to the National Register of Historic Places in 1995.

It is a one-story front gable vernacular style building, on a concrete foundation which was new in 1995.

References

Plana
Presbyterian churches in South Dakota
Churches on the National Register of Historic Places in South Dakota
Churches completed in 1887
Churches in Brown County, South Dakota
Welsh-American history
National Register of Historic Places in Brown County, South Dakota